Bili may refer to:

Bili, Ardabil, a village in Iran
Bili, Azerbaijan, a village in Astara Rayon
Bili, Democratic Republic of Congo, a town in north-central Democratic Republic of the Congo; Bili ape
Bili Forest near the town, a complex mosaic habitat, rich in fauna typifying both savannah and forest habitats
Bili ape, or 'Bondo mystery ape', a large chimpanzee living in Bili Forest
Bili light, a medical therapeutic tool to treat newborn jaundice
Bili, an ancient Chinese term (traditional: 篳篥; simplified: 筚篥) for the guan, a double-reed woodwind instrument
Bilibili, a Chinese video sharing website (NASDAQ stock ticker BILI)
Bilirubin, a breakdown product of heme catabolism found in bile and urine

See also
Billie (disambiguation)
Billy (disambiguation)